Events in the year 2019 in Somalia.

Incumbents
President: Mohamed Abdullahi Mohamed (since 16 February 2017)
Prime Minister: Hassan Ali Khaire (since 1 March 2017)

Events
Somali Civil War (2009–present)

February
 4 February – A bombing at a shopping mall in Mogadishu kills 11 people
 7 February – 2019 Somali First Division season begins
 23 February – Two al-Shabab militants and two civilians were killed in an AFRICON airstrike near Kunyo Barrow.
 28 February – A bombing near the Maka al-Mukarama hotel in Mogadishu kills over 30 people

July
 12 July – Asasey Hotel attack
 24 July – A bombing at a municipal government office in Mogadishu kills seven people, including the mayor

August
 19–31 August – Somalia at the 2019 African Games

December
 7 December – Cyclone Pawan makes landfall at Bosaso
 28 December – A bombing at the Ex-Control Afgoye police checkpoint in Mogadishu kills 85 people

Deaths
 12 July – Hodan Nalayeh (born 1969), media executive, Asasey Hotel attack
 1 August – Abdirahman Omar Osman, (born 1965), Minister of Commerce and Industry (2015–2017) and Mayor of Mogadishu (since 2018), bombing
 20 November – Almaas Elman, peace and human rights activist, shot

See also
2019 in Somaliland

Notes

References

 
2010s in Somalia
Years of the 21st century in Somalia
Somalia
Somalia